Aquilles Gloffka (born 3 January 1937) is a Chilean épée fencer and modern pentathlete. He competed at the 1964 Summer Olympics.

References

1937 births
Living people
Chilean male épée fencers
Chilean male modern pentathletes
Olympic fencers of Chile
Olympic modern pentathletes of Chile
Fencers at the 1964 Summer Olympics
Modern pentathletes at the 1964 Summer Olympics
20th-century Chilean people